Osanai (written:  or ) is a Japanese surname. Notable people with the surname include:

, Japanese theatre director, playwright and actor
, Japanese golfer
, Japanese sport wrestler
, Japanese footballer

Fictional characters
 protagonist of the manga series Ode to Kirihito
, protagonist of the visual novel Aoi Shiro

Japanese-language surnames